The following is an list of massacres and mass murders that have occurred in present-day Switzerland. A mass murder involves the murder of four or more people during the same incident.

Black Death Jewish Persecutions 1348-49

Massacres in Switzerland between 1350 and 1900

Massacres in Switzerland after the Year 1900

See also

 History of Switzerland
 List of battles of the Old Swiss Confederacy
 List of mass shootings in Switzerland

References

Switzerland
Massacres
Massacres
Mass murder in Switzerland